John Thom Clarke Eadie (25 September 1861 – 19 August 1923) was an English brewer and cricketer who played for Derbyshire in 1882.

Eadie was born in Burton-on-Trent Staffordshire, the son of James Eadie and his wife Jean. His father, who was from Scotland, had established the James Eadie brewery company at Burton in 1854. In 1881 Eadie was a clerk in his father's brewery.

Eadie appeared in one match for Derbyshire during the 1882 season, against Lancashire. He finished not out in the first innings but was out for a duck in the second, bowling economically and taking one wicket during the match.

Eadie died at Lichfield at the age of 62.

Eadie's brother, William Eadie and nephew Kenneth Dobson both played first-class cricket for Derbyshire.

See also
Brewers of Burton

References

1861 births
1923 deaths
English cricketers
Derbyshire cricketers